Fishhook is a census-designated place (CDP) in Matanuska-Susitna Borough, Alaska, United States. It is part of the Anchorage, Alaska Metropolitan Statistical Area. At the 2020 census the population was 5,048, up from 4,679 in 2010.

Geography
Fishhook is located at  (61.677320, -149.265043).

It could be characterized as slightly more rural than suburban. It contains a number of mid-sized to small lakes and the Little Susitna River. In general, it is accessed by Wasilla-Fishhook Road.

Demographics

Fishhook first appeared on the 2000 U.S. Census as a census-designated place (CDP). It is not to be confused with an earlier community of the same name, which is now Chalkyitsik.

As of the census of 2000, there were 2,030 people, 663 households, and 509 families residing in the CDP.  The population density was 23.0 people per square mile (8.9/km2).  There were 730 housing units at an average density of 8.3/sq mi (3.2/km2).  The racial makeup of the CDP was 91.4% White, 0.4% Black or African American, 3.6% Native American, 0.8% Asian, 0.2% Pacific Islander, 0.7% from other races, and 3.0% from two or more races.  1.7% of the population were Hispanic or Latino of any race.

There were 663 households, out of which 45.4% had children under the age of 18 living with them, 64.1% were married couples living together, 6.2% had a female householder with no husband present, and 23.2% were non-families. 17.0% of all households were made up of individuals, and 2.6% had someone living alone who was 65 years of age or older.  The average household size was 3.04 and the average family size was 3.44.

In the CDP, the population was spread out, with 34.0% under the age of 18, 8.1% from 18 to 24, 32.7% from 25 to 44, 21.5% from 45 to 64, and 3.7% who were 65 years of age or older.  The median age was 33 years. For every 100 females, there were 108.6 males.  For every 100 females age 18 and over, there were 114.4 males.

The median income for a household in the CDP was $55,179, and the median income for a family was $57,857. Males had a median income of $46,417 versus $25,865 for females. The per capita income for the CDP was $20,042.  About 7.3% of families and 8.5% of the population were below the poverty line, including 9.1% of those under age 18 and 14.0% of those age 65 or over.

References

Anchorage metropolitan area
Census-designated places in Alaska
Census-designated places in Matanuska-Susitna Borough, Alaska
Mining communities in Alaska